The Love Master is a 1924 American silent family drama film starring canine star Strongheart and actress Lillian Rich, directed by Laurence Trimble. The film survives in a French archive.

Plot
As described in a film magazine review, Sally, an attractive young woman, is the only white woman in the isolated northern settlement. David, a young clerk in her uncle's general store, loves her and is worthy of her. Jean Le Roy, a dishonest fur trader, hopes to win her. When David falls ill from overwork and anxiety, she nurses him back to health. She also helps him win the yearly dog race, which gives him sufficient money to marry her and return with her to the United States. The canine story involving Strongheart and his mate generally follows that of the human couple, often with the dogs mimicking their gestures.

Cast

Strongheart as Strongheart the dog
Lady Jule as The Fawn
Lillian Rich as Sally
Harold Austin as David
Hal Wilson as Alec McLeod
Walter Perry as Andrew Thomas Francis Joseph Mulligan
Joseph Barrell as The Ghost
Jack Richardson (uncredited)

References

External links

 — Strongheart and Lady Jule, 1924 Screen Almanac film
Lantern slide

1924 films
American silent feature films
First National Pictures films
Films directed by Laurence Trimble
1924 drama films
Silent American drama films
American black-and-white films
1920s American films
1920s English-language films